The speckled ground squirrel or spotted souslik (Spermophilus suslicus) is a species of rodent in the family Sciuridae from Eastern Europe. Spermophilus suslicus consists of three subspecies: S. s. boristhenicus, S. s. guttatus, and S. s. suslicus. It is threatened by habitat loss.

Description
The speckled ground squirrel has dark-brown fur with white spots on its back and a short, thin tail. It is smaller and less social than many other ground squirrels of the genus Spermophilus.

Distribution
It is found in Belarus, Moldova, Poland, European Russia, and Ukraine. Its natural habitat is temperate grassland and it is also found on cultivated ground.  It is threatened by the loss and fragmentation of its habitat.  Causes of habitat loss include the expansion of agriculture and forestry, the reduction of pasturing, the development and growth of cities, and industrial development.  Also, in some areas it is hunted as an agricultural pest.

The speckled ground squirrel's range in Poland and southern Russia has contracted markedly, with only 10% of its area in the mid-twentieth century currently remaining.  At the current rate of contraction of its range, the speckled ground squirrel will be extinct from Poland within the next couple decades.

Behavior

The speckled ground squirrel is a diurnal species which hibernates from October to April. It is active in the morning once the sun warms the area slightly, retreats to its underground den during the heat of the day, then reemerges late in the day for another feeding bout. It feeds mostly on grasses and cereals, although small vertebrates and arthropods are also eaten.

Compared with other Spermophilus species, it lives in a relatively closed habitat with high grasses that block visibility during its active seasons. Individuals live in separate burrows within a larger colony. These colonies can be up to over 160 individuals per ha. It mates between April and May. Gestation ranges from 23 to 26 days. Four to eight cubs are born per litter. Sporadic hybridization occurs where S. suslicus occurs sympatrically with S. pygmaeus and S. citellus.

Predators
Though there have been no quantitative studies on all the predators of S. suslicus, the weasel Mustela nivalis has been known to enter burrows and cause significant juvenile mortality, though it does not attack adults. However, conspecific predation may be more of a threat to the juvenile speckled ground squirrel than interspecific predators.  Though infanticide in the wild has not yet been reported, the speckled ground squirrel has been infanticidal in captivity. The killer can be male, female, or both, and either eats the young or attacks and leaves it to die.

Alarm call
The speckled ground squirrel uses alarm calls for a variety of purposes.  Primarily, the alarm call is used to warn conspecific squirrels of predators and to alert predators that they've been detected  Individual-specific alarm calls have been seen in Spermophilus suslicus which also contain age-related features but they lack the ability to distinguish between familiar and unfamiliar individuals nor can they distinguish sex.

References

External links

Spermophilus
Mammals described in 1770
Taxa named by Johann Anton Güldenstädt
Taxonomy articles created by Polbot